Tomasz Zamoyski (1594 – 7 January 1638) was a Polish-Lithuanian nobleman (szlachcic) and magnate.

He travelled to London in July 1615 and was invited to hunt with King James at Theobalds. The master of ceremonies at the English court Lewis Lewknor hired two coaches with four horses each to bring Zamoyski to audiences with the King, Anne of Denmark, and Prince Charles.

Tomasz was the 2nd Ordynat of the Zamość estates. He was voivode of Podole Voivodeship in 1618, voivode of Kijów Voivodeship (Kyiv, also Kiev) in 1619, starost of Kraków in 1628, Deputy Chancellor of the Crown in 1635, as well as starost of Knyszyn, Sokal, Nowy Targ, Rabsztyn, Kałusz, Goniądz and Rzeczyce. The town of Tomaszów was named after him.

He married Katarzyna Ostrogska in 1620 and had three children with her.

References

External links

Secular senators of the Polish–Lithuanian Commonwealth
1594 births
1638 deaths
Tomasz
Ruthenian nobility of the Polish–Lithuanian Commonwealth
Crown Vice-Chancellors